Roger Per Arne Johansson (born April 17, 1967 in Ljungby, Sweden) is a former professional Swedish ice hockey player.

Roger Johansson joined Swedish Elite League club Färjestads BK in 1986, when he left Troja-Ljungby. He played with Färjestad until 1989, winning one Swedish Championship with them in 1988. In 1989 he signed with the Calgary Flames of the NHL who had drafted him in 1985 as the 80th pick overall. He played two seasons, a total of 73 games, with the Flames before returning home to Sweden and signing with Leksands IF. But he returned to the Flames in 1992 after only one season with Leksand in Swedish Elite League. Despite playing 77 games and scoring a total of 20 points with the Flames that season, Johansson decided to move back to Sweden once more, and once more he signed with Leksands IF. He played with Leksand during the 1993/94 season. Johansson also started the 1994/95 season with Leksand. But when the NHL lockout ended on January 11, 1995, Johansson signed for the Chicago Blackhawks. Johansson played only a total of 11 games that season with the Blackhawks and decided to move back home to Sweden, this time for good. When he returned to Sweden he signed with Färjestads BK who he had played with in the 80's. Johansson stayed with Färjestad until 2001, when he was forced to retire due to an injury. But before retirering he won two new Swedish Championships in 1997 and 1998.

He has represented Sweden in three IIHF World Championships (1994, 1996 and 1997), the 1996 World Cup of Hockey and in the 1994 Olympics in Lillehammer. In Lillehammer he won the Olympic Gold Medal.

Career statistics

Regular season and playoffs

International

References

External links

1967 births
Living people
Calgary Flames draft picks
Calgary Flames players
Chicago Blackhawks players
Färjestad BK players
Ice hockey players at the 1994 Winter Olympics
Leksands IF players
Medalists at the 1994 Winter Olympics
Olympic gold medalists for Sweden
Olympic ice hockey players of Sweden
Olympic medalists in ice hockey
People from Ljungby Municipality
Swedish expatriate ice hockey players in Canada
Swedish expatriate ice hockey players in the United States
Swedish ice hockey defencemen
Sportspeople from Kronoberg County